Tímea Kiss (born 19 January 1973) is a Hungarian archer. She competed at the 1992 Summer Olympics and the 1996 Summer Olympics.

References

1973 births
Living people
Hungarian female archers
Olympic archers of Hungary
Archers at the 1992 Summer Olympics
Archers at the 1996 Summer Olympics
Sportspeople from Budapest